Frederick J. Jackson (September 21, 1886 – May 22, 1953) was an American author, playwright and screenwriter. He wrote for more than 50 films between 1912 and 1946. Over a forty-year span, a dozen of his plays were produced on Broadway. Several of his plays were turned into films, including The Bishop Misbehaves. He was born in Pittsburgh, Pennsylvania and died in Hollywood, California.

Selected filmography

 Annie-for-Spite (1917)
 The Fatal Ring (1917)
 Tinsel (1918)
 Let's Elope (1919)
 Diamonds Adrift (1921)
 It Can Be Done (1921)
 One a Minute (1921)
 The Hole in the Wall (1921)
 Fools and Riches (1923)
 The Exiles (1923)
 Love Letters (1924)
 Arizona Express (1924)
 The Lone Chance (1924)
 High Speed (1924)
 Shadows of Paris (1924)
 The Dark Swan (1924)
 Stop Flirting (1925)
 Her Man o' War (1926)
 Ladies Beware (1927)
 The Hole in the Wall (1929)
 The Jade Box (1930)
 Let's Love and Laugh (1931)
 My Sin (1931)
 The Perfect Lady (1931)
 Her First Affaire (1932)
 Widow's Might (1935)
 That's My Uncle (1935)
 The Bishop Misbehaves (1935)
 The Great Gambini (1937)
 School for Husbands (1937)
 She Asked for It (1937)
 Wells Fargo (1937)
 Stolen Heaven (1938)
 Say It in French (1938)
 Miracle on Main Street (1939)
 Half a Sinner (1940)
 This Woman is Mine (1941)
 Stormy Weather (1943)
 Hi Diddle Diddle (1943)
 Bedside Manner (1945)
 The Bachelor's Daughters (1946)

Selected plays
 Two Little Girls in Blue (1921)
 The Naughty Wife (1925)
 The Ninth Man (1931)
 The Bishop Misbehaves (1934)

References

External links

1886 births
1953 deaths
American male screenwriters
American male dramatists and playwrights
20th-century American dramatists and playwrights
20th-century American male writers
Writers from Pittsburgh
Screenwriters from Pennsylvania
20th-century American screenwriters